Zhang Jiaqi (born 9 December 1991) is a Chinese professional footballer who plays as a defensive midfielder for Zhejiang.

Club career
Zhang Jiaqi started his football career playing for Le Mans' youth academy. He played for their reserve team before being promoted to the first team in 2012. Zhang made his debut for the club on 8 February 2013 in a 1–1 draw against Clermont Foot. After starting three consecutive games, Zhang scored his first goal on 22 February 2013 in a 3–2 win against Niort which turned out to be the match winner. Zhang became a mainstay in the team's starting eleven for the rest of the season; however, Le Mans was relegated to the third tier on the last day of the 2012–13 season. In November 2013, Swiss Super League side FC Sion announced Zhang had signed a contract with the club after Le Mans lost its professional status; however, Zhang could not register for the club because they had already reached the maximum 25 players allowed in the squad.

On 27 February 2014, Zhang was signed by top tier side Dalian Aerbin on a free transfer. He made his debut for the club on 30 April 2014 in a 1–1 draw against Guizhou Renhe.

On 24 December 2014, Zhang transferred to fellow Chinese Super League side Guangzhou Evergrande after Dalian was relegated at the end of the 2014 season. He was used as a rotation player at the beginning of 2015 season; however, he didn't appear for Guangzhou after Luiz Felipe Scolari became the manager of the club in June 2015. Zhang was downgraded to the reserve squad in the 2016 season. 

On 15 July 2016, he was loaned to China League One side Qingdao Huanghai for the rest of the 2016 season. He made his debut for the club on 16 July 2016 in a 1–1 draw against Meizhou Hakka. On 23 January 2017, Zhang was loaned to second tier side Shenzhen FC for the 2017 season. In February 2018, he was loaned to Guangzhou Evergrande's city rivals Guangzhou R&F for the 2018 season. Failing to establish himself within the team, Zhang appeared just one league match and two FA Cup matches for Guangzhou R&F. Zhang was loaned to Qingdao Huanghai for the second time for one season in February 2019.

On 25 May 2020, Zhang transferred to China League One side Sichuan Jiuniu.

On 16 April 2020, Zhang transferred to Chinese Super League side Zhejiang, the second time he joined the club managed by Jordi Vinyals.

International career
Zhang made his debut for the China national team on 18 June 2014 in a 2–0 win against Macedonia.

Career statistics

Club

International

Honours
Guangzhou Evergrande
Chinese Super League: 2015
AFC Champions League: 2015

Qingdao Huanghai
China League One: 2019

References

External links
 
 

Living people
1991 births
Footballers from Shenyang
Chinese footballers
Association football midfielders
China international footballers
Le Mans FC players
FC Sion players
Dalian Professional F.C. players
Guangzhou F.C. players
Qingdao F.C. players
Shenzhen F.C. players
Guangzhou City F.C. players
Sichuan Jiuniu F.C. players
Ligue 2 players
Swiss Super League players
Chinese Super League players
China League One players
Chinese expatriate footballers
Chinese expatriate sportspeople in France
Expatriate footballers in France
Expatriate footballers in Switzerland